The 2012 Guadiana Trophy was the 12th edition of the competition and took place between 26 and 28 July. It featured Braga, Newcastle United and Olympiacos. The trophy was won by Newcastle United after they drew their first game with Olympiakos and won their second game against Braga, who'd drawn their first game with Olympiakos.

Standings

Matches

2012–13
2012–13 in Portuguese football
2012–13 in English football
2012–13 in Greek football